Stari Grad (lit. "Old Town") is a municipality of the city of Sarajevo, Bosnia and Herzegovina. It is the oldest and most historically significant part of Sarajevo. At its heart is the Baščaršija, the old town market sector where the city was founded by Ottoman general Isa-Beg Ishaković in the 15th century.

Features
The municipality of Stari Grad is characterized by its many religious structures, and examples of unique Bosnian architecture. The eastern half of Stari Grad consists of the Ottoman influenced sectors of the city, while the western half showcases an architecture and culture that arrived with Austria-Hungary, symbolically representing the city as a meeting place between East and West.

The population of Stari Grad is 36,976, making it the least populous of Sarajevo's four municipalities. Its population density of 742.5 inhabitants per km² also ranks it last among the four. Stari Grad contains numerous hotels and tourist attractions including the Gazi Husrev-beg Mosque, Emperor's Mosque, the Sarajevo Cathedral and more.

Demographics

1971
126,598 total
Bosniaks - 74,354 (58.73%)
Serbs - 27,658 (21.84%)
Croats - 12,903 (10.19%)
Yugoslavs - 5,944 (4.69%)
Others - 5,739 (4.55%)

1991
50,744 total
Bosniaks - 39,410 (77.66%)
Serbs - 5,150 (10.14%)
Croats - 1,126 (2.21%)
Yugoslavs - 3,374 (6.64%)
Others - 1,684 (3.35%)

2013
36,976 total
Bosniaks - 32,794 (88.68%)
Croats - 685 (1.85%)
Serbs - 467 (1.26%)
Others - 3,030 (8.19%)

Sites
Prior to 1914, the Austro-Hungarians who ruled Sarajevo wanted land in the Sarajevo Old Town district to build a city hall and library. The land had a home on it and, despite offering the owner money, he refused and continued to refuse even when told that he had to move. When the officials threatened him, he moved the house and rebuilt it, piece by piece, on the other side of the Miljacka river, as a way of spiting the officials. The Sarajevo spite house operates today as a restaurant, called "Inat Kuća", which means "Spite House."

Gallery

See also
Sarajevo
Sarajevo Canton

References

External links

Stari Grad, Sarajevo website

 
Populated places in the Sarajevo Canton
Populated places established in the 1460s
1461 establishments in Europe
Ottoman period in the history of Bosnia and Herzegovina
Architecture in Bosnia and Herzegovina''